The dwarf flying fox, least flying fox, or least fruit bat (Pteropus woodfordi) is a species of flying fox in the family Pteropodidae. It is endemic to the Solomon Islands.  It is threatened by deforestation, which is believed to damage roosting sites in old growth forests.

References

Pteropus
Bats of Oceania
Endemic fauna of the Solomon Islands
Mammals of the Solomon Islands
Vulnerable fauna of Oceania
Mammals described in 1888
Taxonomy articles created by Polbot
Taxa named by Oldfield Thomas